KFLA-LD (channel 8) is a low-power television station in Los Angeles, California, United States, serving Southern California as an affiliate of the 24/7 headline news service NewsNet. It is owned by Roy William Mayhugh. KFLA-LD's transmitter is located atop Mount Wilson.

History
KFLA was originally owned by the Indian Wells Valley TV Booster, providing over-the-air reception of KCAL-TV to the Indian Wells Valley. On January 17, 2005, the station was sold to Roy William Mayhugh, who then moved the station to its present-day channel. Soon after, the station moved to Blue Ridge Mountain in Palmdale and began converting operations to flash-cut to digital television. The station successfully flash-cut to digital on May 3, 2006, and temporarily rebroadcast KCET.

On October 17, 2007, the station successfully moved to Mount Wilson, where other Los Angeles-based stations broadcast from, and was affiliated with the America One network on its main channel. On April 1, 2010, it changed its entertainment channel on DT3 from White Springs Television to the Retro Television Network.

On January 10, 2011, the FCC granted them a STA to operate on an out-of-core digital channel 52, to improve signal strength and to alleviate interference from San Diego CBS affiliate KFMB-TV.  However, the station has stated that they must move back to VHF digital channel 8, due to all non-core channels (52-69) being taken out of service by the end of the year (December 31, 2011), and for all Class A, low-powered and broadcast translator stations to convert to digital by 2015.

Technical information

Subchannels
The station's digital signal is multiplexed:

Translator

References

External links
Official website

NewsNet affiliates
Diya TV affiliates
The Country Network affiliates
Low-power television stations in the United States
Television channels and stations established in 2005
FLA-LD